South Branch Township may refer to:

 South Branch Township, Crawford County, Michigan
 South Branch Township, Wexford County, Michigan
 South Branch Township, Watonwan County, Minnesota
 South Branch Township, Nance County, Nebraska

See also
 South Branch (disambiguation)

Township name disambiguation pages